Ahmed Afifi (born 30 March 1988) is an Egyptian volleyball player. He competed in the 2016 Summer Olympics.

References

1988 births
Living people
Volleyball players at the 2016 Summer Olympics
Egyptian men's volleyball players
Olympic volleyball players of Egypt
Sportspeople from Giza